Willis is an unincorporated community in southwestern Floyd County, Virginia, United States.  It lies along U.S. Route 221 southwest of the town of Floyd, the county seat of Floyd County.  It has an elevation of 2,723 feet (830 m).  Although Willis is unincorporated, it has a post office, with the ZIP code of 24380.

The Willis Presbyterian Church and Cemetery was listed on the National Register of Historic Places in 2007.

References

External links
Floyd Virginia Online

Unincorporated communities in Floyd County, Virginia
Unincorporated communities in Virginia